Goran Markov (born 27 February 1970) is a Macedonian football coach and a former player. He manages the third team of Hertha BSC. He also holds German citizenship.

Markov made seven appearances in the Bundesliga during his playing career.

References

External links
 

1970 births
Living people
Footballers from Skopje
Macedonian footballers
Association football forwards
Blau-Weiß 1890 Berlin players
Türkiyemspor Berlin players
1. FC Union Berlin players
FC Hansa Rostock players
Tennis Borussia Berlin players
Wuppertaler SV players
Bundesliga players
2. Bundesliga players
German footballers
West German footballers
Yugoslav emigrants to West Germany
Macedonian football managers
German football managers
German people of Macedonian descent
Hertha BSC non-playing staff